Osrik Forsberg (26 September 1912 – 11 February 1994) was a Finnish rower. He competed in the men's coxed four event at the 1948 Summer Olympics.

References

1912 births
1994 deaths
Finnish male rowers
Olympic rowers of Finland
Rowers at the 1948 Summer Olympics
Place of birth missing